The Two-Bear Mambo is a 1995 suspense/crime novel written by the American author Joe R. Lansdale. It is the third book in his Hap and Leonard series.

Plot summary
Hap's African American ex-girlfriend set out to attempt to recover the long lost tapes of a deceased bluesman in a Ku Klux Klan infested town in East Texas. After she goes missing, her current boyfriend enlists Hap and Leonard to find out what happened to her. Needless to, they run into a lot of trouble. The town locals do not care and local law enforcement views it as a black-on-black crime not worthy of investigating. Hap, and especially Leonard, are viewed as outside meddlers who should go back to where they came from.

Editions
The book was originally published as a trade hardcover by Mysterious Press which is now out of print. Its most recent publication was issued by Vintage Crime/Black Lizard as a trade paperback in January 2009.

References

External links
Author's official website
Random House website

Novels by Joe R. Lansdale
American crime novels
1995 American novels
Novels set in Texas
Works by Joe R. Lansdale